Jean Fournier (4 May 1914 – 2 June 2003) was a French sports shooter. He competed in the 300 m rifle event at the 1948 Summer Olympics.

References

External links
 

1914 births
2003 deaths
French male sport shooters
Olympic shooters of France
Shooters at the 1948 Summer Olympics
Sportspeople from Gard